Trilocha is a genus of moths of the family Bombycidae first described by Frederic Moore in 1855. It is sometimes treated as a synonym of Ocinara.

Selected species
Trilocha annae (Thiaucourt, 1997)
Trilocha arabica (Wiltshire, 1982)
Trilocha friedeli Dierl, 1978
Trilocha guianensis (Thiaucourt, 2009)
Trilocha myodes West, 1932
Trilocha pallescens Schaus, 1921
Trilocha pulcherioides (Thiaucourt, 2009)
Trilocha varians (Walker, 1855)

Former species
Trilocha sinica Dierl, 1979

References

Bombycidae